Henrico may refer to:


Places

Colonial America
 City of Henrico (Virginia Company), also known as Henrico, a county in the Colony of Virginia
 Henricus, also called Henrico, a settlement in the county, founded in 1611
 Henrico Shire, one of the eight Shires of Virginia, established in 1634

United States
 Henrico, North Carolina, an unincorporated community
 Henrico County, Virginia

People
 Henrico Atkins (born 1966), Barbadian former sprinter
 Henrico Botes (born 1979), Namibian former footballer
 Henrico Drost (born 1987), Dutch footballer

Other uses
 USS Henrico (APA-45), an attack transport of World War II and the Korean War
 Henrico High School, Henrico County, Virginia
 Henrico Theatre, Henrico County, on the National Register of Historic Places

See also
 Henricho Bruintjies (born 1993), South African sprinter
 Henricus (disambiguation)

Masculine given names